Kenneth Charles Howard (born 26 December 1939) is an English songwriter, lyricist, author and television director.

Life and career

Early years
Howard was born in Worthing, West Sussex. From 1947 to 1956, he attended University College School (UCS) in London, where he became friends with Alan Blaikley, and from 1956 to 1957 he attended Aiglon College in Villars, Switzerland. After a year working with Granada Television in London, he went to Edinburgh University where he read Social Anthropology. Cast vocally together with fellow London student Eva Hermann in Varsity Vanities of 1959, they became known as the vocal duo "Eva and Ken", winning a weekly slot in Scottish Television's musical show Jigtime, singing songs from around the world, and recording for Fontana Records. Howard graduated with an MA degree and began working with BBC Television's drama department in White City.

He also joined forces with two old UCS friends, Alan Blaikley and Paul Overy, with whom, between 1962 and 1963, he ran and edited four issues of a magazine, Axle Quarterly, publishing early work by Melvyn Bragg, Ray Gosling, Alexis Lykiard, Gillian Freeman and Simon Raven amongst others. An offshoot of the Quarterly was a series of five booklets on controversial topics commissioned by Blaikley, Howard and Overy, named Axle Spokes (Axle Publications, 1963). These included Peter Graham's The Abortive Renaissance, a critical examination of British New Wave cinema; John Gale's Sex – Is it easy?, the emergence of the permissive society; Gavin Millar's Pop! – Hit or miss?, the British hit-parade in the early days of the Beatles; Anthony Rowley's Another Kind of Loving, homosexuality in the years when it was still a criminal offence in the UK; and Melville Hardiment's Hooked, an enquiry into the extent and nature of drug addiction in the early 1960s.

International hits in the 1960s and 1970s
In the 1960s and 1970s, in collaboration with Alan Blaikley, Ken Howard composed the music and words for many international top 10 hits, including two UK number ones, "Have I the Right?" (The Honeycombs) and "The Legend of Xanadu" (Dave Dee, Dozy, Beaky, Mick & Tich).

Among other performers for whom they wrote were The Herd, Petula Clark, Phil Collins, Sacha Distel, Rolf Harris, Frankie Howerd (the theme song for his film Up Pompeii), Engelbert Humperdinck, Horst Jankowski, Eartha Kitt, Little Eva, Lulu and Matthews Southern Comfort.

Ken Howard and Alan Blaikley were the first British composers to write for Elvis Presley, including the hit "I've Lost You" (1970), which he later performed in the film That's The Way It Is. Their collaboration with the maverick psychiatrist R. D. Laing led to the release of the cult album Life Before Death.

Howard and Blaikley's concept album, Ark 2 (1969), performed by Flaming Youth, drew the comment that Blaikley and Howard "have a wit, gaiety, dignity and melodic flair reminiscent of Leonard Bernstein...which suggest that pop is becoming the serious music – in the proper sense – of the age"

TV themes
Howard and Blaikley were responsible for theme and incidental music for several television drama series including The Flame Trees of Thika (1981) and By the Sword Divided (1983–1985), both subsequently aired in the US on Alistair Cooke’s Masterpiece Theatre, and the BBC's long-running series of Agatha Christie’s Miss Marple (1984–1992). Howard also scored BBC TV's BAFTA and Emmy Award-winning Shadowlands with Claire Bloom and Joss Ackland in 1985, Mervyn Peake's Mr Pye with Derek Jacobi and Judy Parfitt, and Ronald Neame's last film, Foreign Body in 1986, plus BBC TV's The Black and Blue Lamp (1988) and The Angry Earth in 1989.

Musicals
Howard and Blaikley wrote two West End musicals, Mardi Gras (Prince of Wales Theatre, 1976) and The Secret Diary of Adrian Mole (Wyndham's Theatre, 1984–1986), and two BBC TV musicals Orion (1977) and Ain't Many Angels (1978). They also wrote music and lyrics for the 1990 UK tour of Roald Dahl's Matilda.

Film career
As a British film maker Howard has worked extensively in drama, music and documentary films. These have included (for the BBC) A Penny for Your Dreams, John Lennon – A Journey in the Life, The Miracle of Intervale Avenue, Open Mind, Mr Abbott's Broadway and Sunny Stories; (for ITV) South Bank Show profiles of the New World Symphony Orchestra, Danny Kaye, Frank Sinatra, Hakan Hardenberger, Johnnie Ray and Maxim Vengerov, EK-OK, and Will Apples Grow on Mars?. The BBC drama A Penny for Your Dreams which he co-wrote, composed and directed won the Festival Award at the Celtic Media Festival in Caernarfon in 1988. His BBC films, Braveheart and Today I am A Man, both won the Royal Television Society Best Children's Factual Award. His EMI DVD Maxim Vengerov: Living the Dream won the BBC Music Magazine Award for Best Music DVD in 2008.

He was a director of Landseer Productions Ltd in London until 2019.

Other activities
He is also co-founder and ex-director of Sophisticated Games Ltd, having co-devised the best-selling board game of Sophie's World and publishing the million-selling Lord of the Rings board game, as well as numerous other successful games including Ingenious and The Hobbit.
 
His first novel, The Young Chieftain, aimed at a teenage audience, was published by Tamarind Books, a division of Random House, in September 2010. His second novel, Follow Me – A Quest in Two Worlds, was published by Venture Press in November 2017.

Howard is Chairman of The Casey Trust, aiding children worldwide.

References

External links
 Website about Ken Howard and Alan Blaikley, including a biography and audio of some of their hits

1939 births
Living people
English songwriters
English film score composers
English male film score composers
English television directors
English music managers
People from Worthing
British male songwriters
Alumni of Aiglon College
People educated at University College School